It's a Blue World is an album by jazz pianist Red Garland, recorded in 1958 but not released on Prestige Records until 1970.

Track listing 
"This Can't Be Love" (Richard Rodgers, Lorenz Hart) – 8:30
"Since I Fell for You" (Buddy Johnson) – 12:43
"Crazy Rhythm" (Irving Caesar, Joseph Meyer, Roger Wolfe Kahn) – 3.27
"Teach Me Tonight" (Gene de Paul, Sammy Cahn) – 9:03
"It's a Blue World" (Robert Wright, George Forrest) – 5:34

Personnel 
 Red Garland – piano
 Paul Chambers – double bass
 Art Taylor – drums

References 

1970 albums
Albums produced by Bob Weinstock
Prestige Records albums
Red Garland albums
Albums recorded at Van Gelder Studio